Slobodan Rajković (born 3 February 1989) is a Serbian former professional footballer who played as a centre back.

Club career
Born in Belgrade, Rajković started his career with OFK Beograd. He was included in the club's first team at the age of 15. During his second season in the first team, Rajković's reputation grew so such that in November 2005, English Premier League club Chelsea decided to pay €2 million for the 16-year-old centre-half.

Under the terms of the deal, Rajković stayed at OFK Beograd as a loaned player from Chelsea until the end of the 2006–07 Serbian SuperLiga season.

Loans in the Eredivisie
In June 2007, Chelsea decided to loan Rajković to PSV ahead of the 2007–08 season, as part of the deal surrounding Alex's move to Chelsea.

After the year-long loan spell at PSV, the Dutch club wanted to extend the loan period for another year, but Chelsea declined due to the lack of playing time Rajković was receiving in his season at Eindhoven. Rajković, however, returned to the Eredivisie on 9 July 2008, joining Twente on a one-year loan deal.

After spitting at a referee at the 2008 Summer Olympics, Rajković was banned for 12 months by FIFA.
In June 2009, his loan was extended until June 2010.

On 23 August 2010, Rajković transferred to another Eredivisie club, Vitesse, together with his former Chelsea teammates Nemanja Matić and Matej Delač on a season-long loan.

Chelsea
Having returned to Chelsea prior to the 2011–12 season at the request of new manager André Villas-Boas, Rajković played his first game in a Chelsea shirt in a friendly against Wycombe Wanderers on 12 July 2011 at Chelsea's Cobham Training Centre. He played the second half and scored his side's third goal, volleying home a Yuri Zhirkov corner.

Four years after signing for Chelsea, Rajković still remained ineligible for either a work permit or an EU passport, precluding his ability to play in matches open to the public (hence why he played in the closed door game with Wycombe, but could not play against Portsmouth). However, he finally made his debut in a pre-season friendly game against a Malaysian XI, in which he played the whole of the first half. He also played against Kitchee SC in the 2011 Barclays Asia Trophy in Hong Kong.

Hamburger SV
On 23 August 2011, Rajković joined German Bundesliga club Hamburger SV from Chelsea on a four-year deal for €2 million. He did not manage to secure the starter's position in his four years at the club, making only 46 appearances in all competitions.

Darmstadt 98
On 29 September 2015, Rajković signed for Darmstadt 98 on a two-year deal.

Palermo
On 1 August 2016, he was signed by Serie A club Palermo. He played a total three seasons for the Rosanero (one in Serie A, and two in Serie B).

Following Palermo's exclusion from the Serie B, he was released together with all other players in July 2019.

Perugia
On 27 January 2020, after six months of inactivity, Rajković signed a two-and-a-half year contract with Serie B club Perugia as a free transfer.

Lokomotiv Moscow
On 13 August 2020, he signed a one-year contract with Russian Premier League club FC Lokomotiv Moscow. On 19 January 2021, his Lokomotiv contract was terminated by mutual consent.

MTK Budapest
On 10 January 2022, Rajković signed with MTK Budapest in Hungary.

International career
By the age of 16, Rajković was a regular in the Serbia under-21 national team, later becoming the youngest player ever to appear in a qualifying match of the UEFA European Under-21 Football Championship. On 17 June 2007, during the 2007 UEFA European Under-21 Football Championship, which the Serbia U21 team eventually finished as runners-up in, Rajković was part of a controversial second goal for England. He was lying on the ground, injured, and while Serbian players expected their rivals would kick the ball out of the field, Matt Derbyshire went on against a bewildered Serbian defence to score the second goal of the night for England, provoking a turbulent reaction from the Serbian players. Rajković was called for a national team match in 2016, after more than two years.

Style of play
Rajković is known as a highly aggressive player. After his arrival to Hamburger SV, he stated in an interview, "I like to play more aggressive than the referees like."

Career statistics

Club

International

Honours

Club
PSV
Eredivisie: 2007–08

Twente
Eredivisie: 2009–10

References

External links

1989 births
Living people
Footballers from Belgrade
Serbian footballers
Association football defenders
Serbia international footballers
Footballers at the 2008 Summer Olympics
Olympic footballers of Serbia
Serbia under-21 international footballers
OFK Beograd players
Chelsea F.C. players
PSV Eindhoven players
FC Twente players
SBV Vitesse players
Hamburger SV players
SV Darmstadt 98 players
Palermo F.C. players
A.C. Perugia Calcio players
FC Lokomotiv Moscow players
FK TSC Bačka Topola players
MTK Budapest FC players
Serbian SuperLiga players
Eredivisie players
Bundesliga players
Serie A players
Russian Premier League players
Serbian expatriate footballers
Serbian expatriate sportspeople in the Netherlands
Serbian expatriate sportspeople in Germany
Serbian expatriate sportspeople in Italy
Serbian expatriate sportspeople in Russia
Serbian expatriate sportspeople in Hungary
Expatriate footballers in the Netherlands
Expatriate footballers in Germany
Expatriate footballers in Italy
Expatriate footballers in Russia
Expatriate footballers in Hungary